Deztin J. Pryor, known professionally as D.J. Pryor, is an American actor and stand-up comedian. In January 2019, Pryor participated in the CBS Diversity Sketch Comedy Showcase. He has acted in short films.

Early life 
Deztin Pryor is originally from Petersburg, Virginia, slitting some time in Richmond and later moved to Clarksville, Tennessee due to his father's military service. He is the oldest of 12 children. Pryor was born when his mother was 13 years old. As a child, his grandmother would let him watch Bill Cosby and he would secretly watch Richard Pryor. He began doing stand-up comedy professionally at the age of 15 years.

Career 
Pryor performs in a variety of venues from comedy clubs to churches and colleges. He has performed at the Virginia House of Comedy. Pryor was once the opening act for Corey Clark. In 2012, Pryor's promoter and manager was Kasey Carlton.

Pryor has trained under Kim Hardin and participated in improvisation classes with Chris Berube. He has performed in commercials for Allstate and Jack Daniel's. He hosted a radio show, The DJ Pryor Show in early 2014, that will soon become a watchable series. , he was represented by Dan Talent Group. As of February 2019, he is represented by APA Talent Agency and still based out of Clarksville, TN. In January 2019, Pryor participated in the CBS Diversity Sketch Comedy Showcase. He was one of 21 actors and comedians selected out of over 3,000 auditions. Pryor has acted in several short films.

In June 2019, Pryor and his son, Kingston, were featured in a Denny's commercial for Father's Day. The Wired recognized Pryor as a "dadfluencer."

At the close of 2019, DJ Pryor was a guest on Dateline NBC's: A Toast to 2019! and Dick Clark's New Year's Rockin' Eve 2020 to commemorate the highlights of 2019.

As of September 2021, DJ Pryor performed in commercials for the Tennessee Titans. Pryor has also been featured as a guest on "Titans Blitz" showing Wednesdays on Nashville's MyTV 30 and Nashville's Fox 17. Pryor's segment "All Titan'd Up" on "Titans Blitz" will be featured falling on the week of Titans' home games.

Artistry 
Pryor cites Eddie Murphy, Martin Lawrence, Chris Tucker and Flip Wilson as early influences on his style. Pryor's stand-up routines are based on his real life.

Personal life 
Pryor resides in Clarksville, Tennessee. He is married to Shanieke Pryor since 2015. Pryor has three children. His eldest son, Jabari, was born in 2011 to Latosha Roberson. Two kids together with his wife Shanieke Pryor.  In 2017, his second son Kingston Pryor was born. December 7, 2020 Pryor released a video announcing the birth of his daughter Zaria Pryor. In 2019, a home video of him and his 19-month old son babbling went viral. Author Jenny Anderson and Al Race of the Center on the Developing Child at Harvard University remark that Pryor's interaction with his son demonstrates a social-feedback loop called serve-and-return which contributes to child development. Pryor is Christian.

Television

Television 

Dick Clark's New Year's Rockin Eve With Ryan Seacrest 2020
A Toast to 2019!

Filmography

Film 

 Country Strong 
 The Konichiwa Kid 
 Message Read

References 

Living people
Year of birth missing (living people)
21st-century American comedians
21st-century American male actors
Male actors from Tennessee
Comedians from Tennessee
People from Petersburg, Virginia
People from Clarksville, Tennessee
Male actors from Virginia
Comedians from Virginia
African-American male actors
American male comedians
African-American male comedians
American stand-up comedians
African-American stand-up comedians
21st-century African-American people